Jan de Beaufort (2 December 1880 – 2 April 1946) was a Dutch fencer. He competed at three Olympic Games, in 1908 (London), 1912 (Stockholm) and 1924 (Paris).

References

External links

 

1880 births
1946 deaths
Dutch male fencers
Fencers at the 1908 Summer Olympics
Fencers at the 1912 Summer Olympics
Fencers at the 1924 Summer Olympics
Olympic fencers of the Netherlands

People from Doorn
Sportspeople from Utrecht (province)